Walter Joseph Murphy (September 27, 1907 – March 23, 1976) was a relief pitcher in Major League Baseball who played briefly for the Boston Red Sox during the  season. He was born in New York, New York.

In two relief appearances, Murphy allowed two runs and four hits, giving one walk with no strikeouts in two innings of work for a 9.00 earned run average. He did not have a decision or saves.

Murphy died at the age of 68 in Houston, Texas.

External links

Retrosheet

Major League Baseball pitchers
Boston Red Sox players
Baseball players from New York (state)
1907 births
1976 deaths